Hyderabad Metropolitan Region is the metropolitan area covered by the city of Hyderabad in the Indian state of Telangana. The entire region is spread over the districts of Hyderabad District, Bhuvanagiri, Medchal-Malkajgiri, Ranga Reddy, Sangareddy, Medak, and Siddipet.

Jurisdiction 
The areas under Hyderabad Metropolitan Development Authority include districts of Hyderabad district, Medchal district, part of Rangareddy district, Bhuvanagiri district, Sangareddy district, Medak district and Siddipet district.[3] The metropolitan region covers seven districts, 70 mandals, and 1032 villages, including Greater Hyderabad Municipal Corporation which consists of 175 villages and 12 municipalities / nagar panchayats consisting of 31 villages.

Municipal Corporations 
Following Municipal corporation's are in Hyderabad Metropolitan Region.
 Greater Hyderabad Municipal Corporation
 Boduppal Corporation
 Peerzadiguda Corporation
 Nizampet Corporation
 Jawaharnagar Corporation
 Badangpet Corporation
 Meerpet-Jillelaguda Corporation
 Bandlaguda Corporation

Municipal Councils 
Following Mucipal Councils are in Hyderabad Metropolitan Region.

 Sangareddy Town
 Bollaram Municipality
 Tellapur Municipality
 Ameenpur Municipality
 Bhuvanagiri Town Municipality
 Choutuppal Town
 Pochampally
 Medchal Town
 Dhammaiguda Municipality
 Nagaram Municipality
 Pocharam Municipality
 Ghatkesar Town
 Gundlapochampally Municipality
 Thumkunta Municipality
 Dundigal Municipality
 Kompally Municipality
 Pedda Amberpet Municipality
 Ibrahimpatnam Town
 Jalpally Municipality
 Shadnagar Town
 Shamshabad Municipality
 Turkayamjal Municipality
 Adibatla Municipality
 Shankarpally Municipality
 Thukkuguda Municipality
 Manikonda Municipality
 Narsingi Municipality
 Narsapur Town
 Toopran Town

References 

Hyderabad, India